The Maraetotara River is a river of the Hawke's Bay region, New Zealand. It enters Hawke Bay at Te Awanga.

See also
List of rivers of New Zealand

References

River Mouth coordinates

Rivers of the Hawke's Bay Region
Rivers of New Zealand